Crepis bursifolia, commonly known as Italian hawksbeard, is a species of flowering plant in the family Asteraceae. It is native to southern Europe (Spain, France, Italy, Malta, Greece), as well as being sparingly naturalized in California (primarily in the hills east of San Francisco Bay, but with a few collections from open spots in urban areas inside the Cities of Oakland and San Francisco).

Crepis bursifolia  is a perennial herb up to 35 cm (14 inches) tall. One plant can produce as many as 10 flower heads, each with up to 60 yellow ray florets but no disc florets.

References

External links
photo of herbarium specimen at Missouri Botanical Garden
Tela Botanica in French with photo and French distribution map

bursifolia
Flora of Southwestern Europe
Flora of Southeastern Europe
Plants described in 1753
Taxa named by Carl Linnaeus